Ryan Cross (born 6 October 1979) is a former Rugby Union footballer for Racing Metro 92 after signing from USA Perpignan in the French Top 14. He previously played for the Sydney Roosters in the National Rugby League (NRL) competition, the Western Force and the NSW Waratahs in Super Rugby and the Australia national rugby union team.

Early life
But he decided to switch codes and joined the Sydney Roosters rugby league club. His brother Clay is an international shot put athlete.

Rugby league career
Cross made his first-grade debut on 17 April 1998, scoring two tries against the Manly-Warringah Sea Eagles. After a promising start to his league career, including an appearance at centre in the 2000 NRL Grand Final, the Roosters' first in 20 years, he had two serious leg injuries. A broken leg saw him miss much of the 2001 NRL season. Just a few matches into the 2002 NRL season he suffered a major knee injury that kept him out for the remainder of that year. That season, Sydney Roosters won the Premiership, their first in 27 years. Cross returned in the 2003 NRL season, finishing as the club's leading try-scorer. He played at centre in the Roosters' loss to the Panthers in the 2003 NRL Grand Final.

In 2004 Cross was chosen to represent City Origin. He then went on to play for the Roosters at centre in their loss to cross-Sydney rivals the Bulldogs in the 2004 NRL Grand Final.

In 2005 Cross was again chosen to represent City Origin. He was suspended for six weeks for eye-gouging Parramatta's Glenn Morrison in a match which the Roosters won 12–8. His absence proved costly for the Roosters as they just missed the finals that year. Cross was named the 2005 Sydney Roosters season player of the year.

In June 2006, after a period of speculation and rumour, Cross signed a two-year deal with the Australian Rugby Union and went to Perth to play for the new Super Rugby side, the Western Force. Cross left the Roosters as the fifth-highest try scorer in the club's history, with 85 tries from his 143 matches. He also played in three losing Grand Finals for the club.

Rugby union career
Cross made his debut Super Rugby with the Western Force on 2 February 2007, against the Highlanders. He went on to play every match that season and scored three tries.

After an outstanding 2008 Super 14 season, in which he won The West Australian/Rosendorff Emirates Western Force Player of the Year Award, Cross was called up for national duty by new Wallabies coach Robbie Deans.

He scored his first Wallaby try against France at the Suncorp Stadium, Brisbane, in his second test on 5 July 2008, having come on as a Second-Half replacement. He followed this with another try later on in the game, both came from Matt Giteau passes.

Ryan Cross got his full test debut against New Zealand on 26 July in place of the injured Stirling Mortlock. He scored the first try which contributed to the 34–19 victory over the All Blacks.

In 2011 Cross signed with the NSW Waratahs and played in 15 matches during the 2011 Super Rugby season. After playing off the bench in the first few matches, Cross then played the remaining matches as the regular starting centre, including the semi final loss to the Auckland Blues in Auckland.

At the conclusion of the 2011 Super Rugby season Cross signed for USA Perpignan in the French Top 14. The 3-month contract was cover for centres David Marty and Maxime Mermoz who were on 2011 Rugby World Cup duty with the French team who lost the final to host team New Zealand. He currently plays for Racing Metro 92.

Ryan stepped back into Suburban Rugby in Sydney and played for 2 seasons for Balmain Rugby who won the Kentwell cup competition as joint premiers in 2013..

References

External links
Western Force profile 
Fox Sports profile

1979 births
Living people
Australian rugby league players
Australian rugby union players
Australia international rugby union players
Western Force players
New South Wales Waratahs players
USA Perpignan players
Rugby league centres
Rugby union centres
Rugby league players from Sydney
Rugby union players from Sydney
Expatriate rugby union players in France
Sydney Roosters players
New South Wales City Origin rugby league team players
Prime Minister's XIII players